Alan Dorney (born 18 May 1947 in Bermondsey, London) is an English footballer who made more than 250 appearances in the Football League playing as a central defender for Millwall.

References

1947 births
Living people
English footballers
Footballers from Bermondsey
Association football defenders
Dartford F.C. players
Millwall F.C. players
English Football League players